Austroderia is a genus of five species of tall grasses native to New Zealand, commonly known as toetoe. The species are A. toetoe, A. fulvida, A. splendens, A. richardii and A. turbaria. They were recently reclassified in 2011 from the genus Cortaderia, although their distinctiveness had been recognized as early as 1853.

The name toetoe comes from the Māori language.

Two closely related South American species are Cortaderia jubata and C. selloana (Pampas Grass), which have been introduced to New Zealand and are often mistaken for toetoe. These introduced species tend to take over from the native toetoe and are regarded as invasive weeds. Among the differences between Pampas, Toetoe has a drooping flower head, a cream coloured plume, and the leaves do not break when tugged firmly. Toetoe also has a white, waxy bloom on the leaf-sheath and conspicuous veins between the midrib and leaf margin.

Common uses
The Māori used the toetoe leaves to make baskets, kites, mats, wall linings and roof thatching. It was also used to make containers to cook food in hot springs, due to the fibres being water-resistant. The flower stalks were also useful - as frames for kites, and in tukutuku panelling. The seed heads themselves were used on fresh wounds to stop bleeding. Other medicinal uses included treatment of diarrhoea, kidney complaints, and burns. Toetoe is New Zealand's largest native grass, growing in clumps up to 3m in height.

Other names
Māori names for toetoe to its varieties include: toetoe-kākaho, toetoe-mokoro, toetoe-rākau. The flower stem is kākaho.

Toetoe is also known as 'cutty grass', especially among children, because the serrated leaf edges can cut the skin. Cutty grass is also used in New Zealand to refer to Gahnia setifola (mapere), Cyperus ustulatus (upoko tangata) and Carex geminata.

Species

 Austroderia fulvida (North + South Islands)
 Austroderia richardii (North + South Islands; naturalised in Tasmania)
 Austroderia splendens (coastal parts of North Island)
 Austroderia toetoe (North Island)
 Austroderia turbaria (Chatham Islands)

References

Danthonioideae
Bunchgrasses of Australasia
Endemic flora of New Zealand
Grasses of New Zealand
Poaceae genera